Tomie appeared as a serial in the manga magazine Monthly Halloween from 1997 to 2000. Two volumes were collected into the overarching series  as volume 1 and 2 of the series. The manga series was released in an omnibus volume in February 2000 titled, . ComicsOne released both volumes on April 1, 2001, with flipped artwork (read left-to-right).

A second series titled  was serialized in Nemuki and was collected into a single bound volume titled  and released in March 2001. Tomie was re-released again as part of  series. This version was also released in two volumes with the addition of the chapters originally released in Tomie Again. Dark Horse Comics released this version in its original right-to left format.

A new arc titled Tomie: Takeover was released exclusively with the DVD release of the Junji Ito Collection on March 30, 2018, April 27, 2018, and May 25, 2018.

Volumes

Original release
The Junji Ito Horror Comic Collection

Tomie Again

Re-release

References

Tomie
Tomie